The Royal Public School is a private school located in Adalhat, Mirzapur District of Uttar Pradesh, India. It educates in English medium from pre-kindergarten to Class X.

History

The school was founded by Vijay Shankar in 2000. It is now operated by the Royal Public School Education Society.

It was one of the first schools to establish English as the medium of instruction in Adalhat.

System of education

Primary School - Pre-KG to Class 4
The Primary School programme comprises Lower and Upper Kindergarten (LKG and UKG) years and classes I to IV. In classes LKG to IV, the school follows an integrated curriculum by drawing on teaching programmes of the CBSE

Middle School : Class 5 to Class 7
The Middle School Programme i.e. Classes 5 to 7, build on the foundations laid in previous years.

Secondary school
The school prepare in class VIII what students will study in Classes IX and X.

External links
 

Private schools in Uttar Pradesh
Primary schools in Uttar Pradesh
High schools and secondary schools in Uttar Pradesh
Mirzapur district
Educational institutions established in 2000
2000 establishments in Uttar Pradesh